Ernst Oscar Ernfrid Appelqvist (15 June 1888 – 26 January 1966), later known as Ernest Applequist, was a Swedish diver who competed in the 1912 Summer Olympics.

He finished fifth in his first round heat of the 3 metre springboard event and did not advance to the final.

A native of Stockholm, Applequist immigrated to the United States after the Olympics, living in Minnesota and New York.  During World War II, he worked a night shift at the General Electric plant in Schenectady, New York, while each day broadcasting a 30-minute news program via shortwave radio  to Sweden. "I would love to do anything can to sway the minds of the Swedish people away from the Nazis," he said in a 1942 interview.

Applequist later moved to San Jose, California, where he died in 1966.

References

1888 births
1966 deaths
Swedish male divers
Olympic divers of Sweden
Divers at the 1912 Summer Olympics
Swedish emigrants to the United States
People from  San Jose, California
Divers from Stockholm
19th-century Swedish people
20th-century Swedish people